Vatica albiramis is a tree in the family Dipterocarpaceae, native to Borneo. The specific epithet means "white twigs".

Description
The inflorescences bear yellow flowers.

Distribution and habitat
Vatica albiramis is endemic to Borneo.

References

albiramis
Endemic flora of Borneo
Plants described in 1927